Philorhizus sigma is a species of brown coloured ground beetle in the Lebiinae subfamily that can be found in everywhere in Europe, except for Andorra, Croatia, Monaco, San Marino, Vatican City and European islands. It is also found in such Asian countries as Georgia and Israel.

Description and habitat
Its elytron is elongate and have a transverse band that is dark in colour. The  pronotum is bright red coloured while the wings are absent. It can be found in marshes and fens. The species is considered to be Vulnerable in the United Kingdom.

References

Lebiinae
Beetles of Asia
Beetles of Europe
Taxa named by Pietro Rossi
Beetles described in 1790